A national market system plan (or NMS plan) is a structured method of transmitting securities transactions in real-time.  In the United States, national market systems are governed by section 11A of the Securities Exchange Act of 1934.

In addition to processing the transactions themselves, these plans also emit the price, volume data, and regulatory auditing information for these transactions.  Information on each securities trade is sent to a central network at the Securities Industry Automation Corporation (SIAC) where it is then distributed, consolidated with other trades on the same "tape".

There are three major tapes in the United States: Tape A and Tape B (which together are called the "Consolidated Tape"), and Tape C.

CTA/CQ Plans (Consolidated Tape)
The Consolidated Tape is overseen by the Consolidated Tape Association.

OTC/UTP Plan
Tape C contains stocks listed on the NASDAQ Exchange or NASDAQ Small Cap Market, and is overseen by the OTC/UTP Operating Committee.

OPRA Plan
The Options Price Reporting Authority provides trade and quote information for selected Market Centers.

See also
 Consolidated Tape System
 Ticker tape

References

Financial markets